In the Philippines, variety television shows have become mainstays of the noontime slot for network programming since 1958. The first Philippines noontime variety television shows were influenced by the popularity of bodabil (vaudeville) in the first half of the 20th century. Since then, the format has evolved with the changing times, with elements of reality television also incorporated as well since the 2000s.

Highlights 
The longest-running noontime variety show in the Philippines is Eat Bulaga!, which celebrated its 43rd anniversary on July 30, 2022.

GMA, Kapamilya Channel/A2Z, and TV5 each air up to two noontime shows a week. A weeklong noontime show usually runs from Monday to Saturday, and a separate noontime show is reserved for Sundays.

 GMA Network: Eat Bulaga!, All-Out Sundays and TiktoClock
 Kapamilya Channel/A2Z It's Showtime and ASAP Natin 'To
TV5: Lunch Out Loud

History

Student Canteen (1958–1965) 

Student Canteen was the first noontime variety show on Philippine television. It was originally a radio show on DZXL that was brought to television on CBN-9 in July 1958 upon the sign-on of its television station, DZXL-TV. It was hosted by Eddie Ilarde, Pepe Pimentel and Leila Benitez. Alternating as pinch-hitters were Bobby Ledesma and Bobby de Veyra. It ended in 1965 when Ilarde went to politics and was succeeded by several noontime shows before returning in 1975.

Student Canteen's successors (1965–1975) 
Magandang Tanghali, a musical variety show hosted by Pancho Magalona, and Stop Look and Listen, a former noontime variety show hosted by Eddie Mesa, took over Student Canteen's timeslot in 1965. When Mesa left for the United States, Twelve O'Clock High, a show hosted by Ariel Ureta and Tina Revilla-Valencia, premiered and aired until 1972 when martial law was declared and many television stations were shut down by the Marcos regime. The show moved to RBS (now GMA Network) as Ariel con Tina, a blocktimer by a company headed by Romy Jalosjos from 1972 to 1974. Lunch Break also became popular on the same channel before Student Canteen was eventually revived.

Student Canteen's revival and the birth of Eat Bulaga! (1975–present) 
Student Canteen was revived in 1975 by Ilarde, who produced the program under his production company Program Philippines, Inc. after accepting an offer from GMA Network executives. He was joined by Ledesma and Pepe Pimentel with new co-hosts Helen Vela and Coney Reyes.

Student Canteen became the most-watched noontime program in the 1970s and Program Philippines branched out to produce other TV shows on GMA-7. The comic trio of Tito Sotto, Vic Sotto, and Joey de Leon (collectively known as TVJ) became guest hosts on Student Canteen when some of the main hosts went on leave. Student Canteen was the only noontime variety show on Philippine television from 1975 to 1979. Production Specialists, Inc. offered TVJ to host a new noontime show for RPN in 1979. After some misunderstandings with the Student Canteen's main hosts, they decided to accept the offer and Eat Bulaga! aired its first episode on July 30, 1979. The trio were accompanied by Richie D' Horsie and Chiqui Hollmann.

Competition 
Two-way competitions between noontime shows started in 1979 when Eat Bulaga! (first aired in RPN 9) fought against Student Canteen (aired on GMA 7). Since then, Eat Bulaga! has faced several rivalries with other noontime shows through the years.

Student Canteen (1979–1986) 
Eat Bulaga! (EB) struggled with its ratings due to a lack of advertisers in its first year of airing due to Student Canteen's stronghold on television. EB was in danger of cancellation until "Mr. Macho" was launched in 1980, which allowed EB to surpass Student Canteen's ratings. EB started airing nationwide in 1982 with the launch of RPN's domestic satellite, which also coincided with Coney Reyes' transfer to EB and Chiqui Hollman to Student Canteen. Other people were introduced in Student Canteen but the show was eventually canceled by the GMA management in March 1986, after the People Power Revolution (also known as the EDSA Revolution) that toppled the Marcos regime one month earlier in February 1986. Student Canteen was revived in 1989 on RPN-9 but was canceled in 1990 after a misunderstanding occurred between the show's producers and the RPN management.

Lunch Date (1986–1993) 
Lunch Date became Student Canteen's successor in 1986 and was GMA Network's first station-produced noontime variety show. Its original hosts were Orly Mercado, Rico J. Puno, Toni Rose Gayda and Hollmann. When the show was reformatted after a year, it only retained Gayda and Hollman and brought in some new and old people to host the show, including Randy Santiago, Keno, Lito Pimentel, Tina Revilla, Pilita Corrales, Louie Heredia, Sheryl Cruz, Jon Santos, Dennis Padilla, Fe Delos Reyes, Manilyn Reynes, Willie Revillame and Ai Ai de las Alas. The show introduced new segments that challenged EB's reign in the noontime slot.

In 1987, EB's ratings improved when Aiza Seguerra, a Little Miss Philippines winner, joined the show and became highly approved to viewers. In 1989, changes were made to both noontime shows: former RPN-9 executive Wilma Galvante and former EB writer Vincent Dy Buncio joined Lunch Date as the executive producer and director of the show respectively. Meanwhile, EB moved to ABS-CBN due to RPN's sequestration under the Cory Aquino administration. EB (together with its sister shows produced by TAPE, Inc.) helped ABS-CBN increased its ranking to No. 1 TV network from No. 4. It also started the rivalry of GMA Network and ABS-CBN in the noontime slot that existed until May 5, 2020, when the broadcasting franchise of ABS-CBN lapsed. In 1993, GMA Network's management decided to reformat their own noontime show and replaced it by SST: Salo-Salo Together. According to de Leon, Lunch Date was their toughest opponent ever because it was pitted against EB for more than 6 years, the longest compared to other noontime shows.

SST: Salo-Salo Together (1993–1995) 
SST first aired on March 20, 1993, as a replacement for Lunch Date, hosted by Randy Santiago, Dennis Padilla, and Smokey Manaloto with Liezl Martinez, Anjanette Abayari, Joy Ortega and Giselle Sanchez as co-hosts. In less than six months after it aired, SST started to overtake EB in ratings by providing fresh interactive segments. Ai-Ai delas Alas (who previously co-hosted "Lunch Date") and Bayani Agbayani (who was part of  "SST"'s production staff) were also hired to be co-hosts for the show.

It started as a blind item as 1994 was about to end until news had leaked out that SST was going to go off the air to give way to EB the 12 pm slot, after EB itself had decided to move to GMA Network following their contract with ABS-CBN was bogged down. During SST's New Year episode on December 31, 1994, the announcement of the new variety show's move to GMA was officially made by main hosts Randy Santiago and Dennis Padilla. The management decided to keep SST after they decided to move it to an earlier time slot, as a pre-programming to EB. SST aired its last noontime episode on January 27, 1995. In June 1995, SST was permanently canceled.

'Sang Linggo nAPO Sila (1995–1998) 
After Eat Bulaga! moved to GMA Network, ABS-CBN decided to make Sa Linggo nAPO Sila into a weeklong noontime show as Sang Linggo nAPO Sila (SLNS). It aired its pilot episode on February 4, 1995, led by the APO Hiking Society. During its first year, 'Sang Linggo led the ratings in the provinces and cities where ABS-CBN had a stronger signal. The real challenge to the show was deviating its content from the usual noontime variety show that Eat Bulaga! presented to the viewers for almost two decades. Meanwhile, Bulaga had presented new faces like Allan K., Jose Manalo, and Donna Cruz, and new segments such as Super SiReyna and Philippine Bulaga Association. Calendar Girl was introduced by SLNS in 1998 with John Estrada, Randy Santiago, and Willie Revillame handling the segment by delivering naughtier jokes on TV.

The rating for SLNS had improved but the main hosts did not agree with the changes on their show. Eventually, ABS-CBN ended their noontime show in November 30, 1998, due to criticisms that some of the show's hosts lack real connection with the masses. Magandang Tanghali Bayan took place with its main hosts: Santiago, Estrada, and Revillame.

Magandang Tanghali Bayan (1998–2003) 
After the APO failed to beat the EB's high ratings, Randy, John, and Willie was pitted to the established trio of Tito, Vic, and Joey as ABS-CBN launched its new noontime show on November 30, 1998, with the title Magandang Tanghali Bayan. Its highlight segment, Pera O Bayong, made Magandang Tanghali Bayan overtook EB's ratings for years. Due to the growing popularity of the show, EB gave its first millions on television through its new segments Meron O Wala and the all-time popular segment Laban O Bawi which featured the phenomenal all-female dance group Sexbomb Girls. Magandang Tanghali Bayan faced numerous controversies and suspensions including the one-week suspension of the show in August 1999 due to the notorious green jokes of the main hosts. During that week, a placeholder show entitled Esep-Esep filled in the timeslot. In 2001, Revillame was dismissed from the show which resulted in major changes, such as new hosts and segments.

Another triumvirate was introduced on Magandang Tanghali Bayan when matinee idols Rico Yan, Dominic Ochoa, and Marvin Agustin joined the show after Willie's exit. Their addition resulted in the show bringing in a younger demographic and a more wholesome approach to noontime viewing. However, on March 29, 2002, Yan died during his Lenten vacation in Palawan and Magandang Tanghali Bayan later on reformatted on November 23, 2002, with new segments and additional hosts, after it had lost its victory in terms of ratings to EB.  The reformat, however, failed to stop the management in deciding to bring back Revillame effective February 22, 2003, which led to its second incarnation, Masayang Tanghali Bayan.

Masayang Tanghali Bayan (2003–2004) 
Magandang Tanghali Bayan aired its last episode on February 21, 2003, and was replaced by Masayang Tanghali Bayan as ABS-CBN's response to the noontime competition against EB. The new MTB premiered on February 22, 2003, and was simulcasted on ABS-CBN's VHF (led by flagship station Channel 2) and UHF channels (Studio 23) nationwide, with Revillame reunited with Santiago and Estrada, along with co-hosts Padilla, delas Alas, Bayani Agbayani, Mickey Ferriols, Aubrey Miles, Tado, and Bentong. The show gave out more cash prizes than its predecessor through the segments Super Jack En Poy and Urong Sulong, that gave away 2 million pesos as a jackpot prize.

Before the end of 2003, Revillame resigned from the show in regards to his derogatory joke against their co-host Mahal. The show continued to air until February 2004 with comedian Vhong Navarro and actor-host Edu Manzano taking over Willie's place. However, Masayang Tanghali Bayan failed to sustain viewership and was cancelled on February 20, 2004, two days before their first anniversary on television.

MTB: Ang Saya Saya (2004–2005) 
The third incarnation of MTB, entitled MTB: Ang Saya Saya premiered on February 21, 2004, with delas Alas, Manzano, and Arnell Ignacio as its main hosts. The show introduced a new set of co-hosts and segments, with a focus on reality talent-based search on the latter. However, these efforts were overshadowed by the Silver Anniversary Special of EB which received the highest rating of a noontime show exceeding 30%. On November 15, 2004, MTB: Ang Saya Saya lost its 12 pm slot to Kris Aquino's Pilipinas, Game KNB? and started airing as an afternoon variety show on a 1:00 pm time slot as the network's strategic move against the anniversary special, which failed. After months of low ratings, the management decided to cancel MTB: Ang Saya Saya on February 4, 2005, and launched a new noontime show hosted by Revillame.

Wowowee (2005–2010) 
Wowowee was ABS-CBN's longest-running noontime show. Former MTB main host Revillame returned on the noontime slot with the new show Wowowee on February 5, 2005. ABS-CBN's influence worldwide (via TFC) helped Wowowee lead the noontime race for years.

Wowowee faced controversies during its five-year run on television. The ULTRA Stampede, which happened during the first anniversary of the show, led to the death of 71 people. The Guinness World Records cited the incident as "the greatest death toll in a game show." Another controversy was the Hello Papi scandal, wherein Revillame allegedly cheated a contestant during the jackpot round on one of the Wowowee's game segments. The scandal also led to an on-air argument between Revillame and de Leon.

Competition became harder for EB so they decided to take a different approach. To celebrate their 30th anniversary in 2009, they honored people from different fields, gave scholarships to honor students, and built classrooms for public schools in different provinces. EB also renovated their studio to accommodate more studio audience, install LED screens, and to commemorate the first death anniversary of Francis Magalona on March 6, 2010. EB also launched its widely popular segment Juan for All, All for Juan: Bayanihan of D' Pipol (a regular segment which broadcasts from different barangays).

In 2010, Revillame threatened ABS-CBN management to remove radio/TV host Jobert Sucaldito, or he would resign from the noontime show due to Sucaldito's criticisms against Revillame and Wowowee. On May 5, Revillame left permanently. After negotiations between Revillame and the network, the network decided that Wowowee would air its final episode on July 30, 2010 (coinciding with Eat Bulaga!'s 31st anniversary). The show was replaced by Pilipinas Win Na Win. Revillame subsequently had stints with TV5 from October 23, 2010 (five months after he left from hosting Wowowee on May 5, 2010 and three months after the said show ended on July 30 of that year) to October 12, 2013 as a primetime game show host in Willing Willie, Wil Time Bigtime and briefly returned to noontime with Wowowillie.  In 2015, he returned to Philippine television with hosting Wowowin, a primetime variety game show with the same format with Wowowee airing since 2015.

Pilipinas Win Na Win (2010) 
Pilipinas Win Na Win was ABS-CBN's shortest-lived noontime show. After Wowowee's cancellation, Pilipinas Win Na Win premiered on July 31, 2010, with Kris Aquino and Robin Padilla as its main hosts, while some co-hosts from Wowowee joined. Some of the show's staff left the show to join Revillame's comeback on TV5 In 2010. After receiving consistently low ratings since launch, ABS-CBN asked Aquino mid-September to leave the show; she quietly left in September 2010. Two days later on October 2, ABS-CBN officially announced four new hosts and two new co-hosts. The four hosts tagged as the "hitmakers" include Rico J. Puno, Rey Valera, Marco Sison, and Nonoy Zuñiga.

Pilipinas Win Na Win ended on December 31, 2010, during the New Year celebration after constant low ratings and changing time slots. The cancellation was announced by Puno several times during the December 20 episode. Rumors were posted on entertainment websites from interviews of a fellow co-host, Valerie Concepcion before the network announced its cancellation. Its time slot was later occupied by Showtime from October 2010 (three months after Wowowee ended) to February 11, 2011, moving Pilipinas Win Na Win to a later noontime slot from October to December 31, 2010. On February 12, 2011, a new noontime show was aired entitled Happy Yipee Yehey!.

Happy Yipee Yehey! (2011–2012) 
The unsuccessful stint of PWNW was immediately replaced by Happy Yipee Yehey! which premiered on February 12, 2011. Before its premiere, Willie Revillame (then-host of Willing Willie on TV5) challenged its upcoming host John Estrada that HYY would not reach its success in terms of ratings and Revillame will promote Eat Bulaga! constantly on his show. HYY was hosted by former MTB hosts John Estrada and Randy Santiago, Toni Gonzaga, Rico J. Puno, Pokwang, and others. The new noontime show introduced segments similar to its predecessors like Pera O Bayong, My Girl and Miss Kasamabahay.

Revillame's prediction was correct. HYY received consistently low ratings due to Eat Bulaga!'s strong noontime viewership. In January 28, 2012, Showtime was canceled from its late-morning slot, and it was later revealed that Showtime would be formatted into a new noontime variety show to replace HYY. The drama series Mundo Man ay Magunaw and Kapamilya Blockbusters took over the timeslot of Showtime from January 30 to February 3, 2012. Happy Yipee Yehey! aired its final episode on February 4, 2012 (where it took over Showtime's timeslot on Saturday) to give way to the return of Showtime on a noontime slot after one year on February 6, 2012, as It's Showtime.

It's Showtime (2009–present) 
Showtime was a morning talent show that started airing on October 24, 2009, as a lead-in program to Wowowee, overtook the ratings of both Wowowee and EB. The show became a noontime show from October 2010 (three months after Wowowee ended) to February 11, 2011, before returning to the morning slot in February 12, 2011.

Showtime became the top morning variety show and prompted ABS-CBN management to make it again a noontime show as It's Showtime after one year on February 6, 2012. The new noontime show introduced segments from the Showtime series and new segments like Sine Mo 'To, AdVice Ganda, That's My Tomboy, I Am PoGay, and Magpasikat. The show is currently hosted by Vice Ganda, Anne Curtis, Vhong Navarro, Jhong Hilario, Karylle, Ryan Bang, Ogie Alcasid, Amy Perez, Jugs Jugueta and Teddy Corpuz. Currently, they feature the segments Tawag ng Tanghalan, ReIna ng Tahanan, and Madlang Pi-POLL. All of these segments have high ratings to rival EB since 2016, with EB leading in NUTAM and It's Showtime leading in KANTAR.

Lunch Out Loud (2020–present) 
Lunch Out Loud is one of the numerous programs produced by Brightlight Productions, a production outfit of former Rep. Albee Benitez, that serves as the blocktimer of TV5 and was directed by newcomer Bjoy Balagtas. Serving as Creative Director to the show was veteran television director and former Star Magic head and now GMA Artist Center consultant Johnny Manahan. Former It's Showtime director Bobet Vidanes later on joined the show in November 2020 also as a Creative consultant until he took over from Manahan as Creative Director in 2021.

On July 16, 2022, Lunch Out Loud was reformatted as Tropang LOL and started airing as a late-morning variety show. The show also began its simulcast in the pay TV Kapamilya Channel, Kapamilya Online Live, and A2Z as a preprogramming to its former rival It's Showtime which also started its simulcast on TV5 the same day.

Sunday noontime shows 
Currently, ABS-CBN's ASAP holds the record of being the longest-running Sunday noontime variety show which began airing in 1995 when Eat Bulaga! moved to GMA Network and the Sunday noontime show Sa Linggo nAPO Sila became a weeklong noontime show. During its 22nd anniversary, ASAP surpassed GMA Supershow as the longest-running Sunday noontime variety show.

Its current rival program is All-Out Sundays aired on GMA Network. AOS aired its pilot episode in January 2020 as a replacement to Sunday PinaSaya.

Other popular defunct Sunday noontime variety shows include:

List of weeklong noontime variety shows aired from 1958-present 

Length of current noontime shows are as of February 6, 2018. Noontime shows without specific dates of first and/or last broadcast were given approximate length of broadcast.

See also 
 Eat Bulaga!
 It's Showtime
 TiktoClock
 Lunch Out Loud
 All-Out Sundays
 ASAP Natin 'To
 List of longest-running Philippine television series

References 

Noontime variety
Noontime variety
Variety shows